Microchlamylla is a genus of sea slugs, specifically aeolid nudibranchs, marine gastropod molluscs in the family Coryphellidae.

Species 
Species within the genus Microchlamylla are as follows:
 Microchlamylla amabilis (Hirano & Kuzirian, 1991)
 Microchlamylla gracilis (Alder & Hancock, 1844)

References

Coryphellidae
Gastropod genera